The 1997–98 season was the 66th season in the existence of FC Metz and the club's 31st consecutive season in the top-flight of French football. In addition to the domestic league, Metz participated in this season's editions of the Coupe de France, the Coupe de la Ligue and UEFA Cup.

Players
Squad at end of season

Competitions

Overview

Division 1

League table

Results summary

Results by match

Matches

Coupe de France

Coupe de la Ligue

UEFA Cup

First round

Second round

References

FC Metz seasons
Metz